The Theodore Wood House is a historic house at 1420 Hollister Hill Road in Marshfield, Vermont.  Built about 1887, it is the only known surviving work of Chester James Wood, a local builder of some reputation, and is the town's only significant surviving example of Second Empire architecture.  It was listed on the National Register of Historic Places in 2005.

Description and history

The Theodore Wood House sits on a gentle knoll on Hollister Hill Road in Marshfield, Vermont in a pastoral setting of unpaved roads. Built in 1885, the residence fronts to the south, seventy-five feet from Hollister Hill Road at its intersection with Eaton Cemetery Road. with sweeping views of open pastures and distant mountain views in all directions.

The int

See also
National Register of Historic Places listings in Washington County, Vermont

References

Houses on the National Register of Historic Places in Vermont
National Register of Historic Places in Washington County, Vermont
Second Empire architecture in Vermont
Houses completed in 1885
Houses in Washington County, Vermont
Buildings and structures in Marshfield, Vermont